The 3. Liga is the third-tier football league of Slovakia. It currently consists of two divisions, two of sixteen teams (division East and division West) from 2022–23 season.

Sponsorship

Clubs

2022–23 members

West division
 FK Inter Bratislava
 ŠK Vrakuňa
 OK Častkovce
 TJ KOVO Beluša
 FK Podkonice
 AFC Nové Mesto nad Váhom
 OFK Malženice
 FKM Nové Zámky
 MŠK Fomat Martin
 FC Slovan Galanta
 TJ Družstevník Veľké Ludince
 KFC Kalná nad Hronom
 FK Slovan Duslo Šaľa
 ŠKF Sereď
 RSC Hamsik Academy
 TJ Jednota Bánová

East division
 MŠK Rimavská Sobota
 TJ Baník Kalinovo
 ŠK Novohrad Lučenec
 FTC Fiľakovo
 TJ Tatran Oravské Veselé
 MŠK Námestovo
 FK Spišská Nová Ves
 MFK Vranov nad Topľou
 MFK Snina
 MŠK Tesla Stropkov
 1.FK Svidník
 FK Poprad
 ŠK Odeva Lipany
 MFK Slovan Giraltovce
 Slávia TU Košice
 Partizán Bardejov

References

External links
Official site

 
3
Slova
Professional sports leagues in Slovakia